Franchesco Angel Flores Ayo (born 15 June 2001) is a Peruvian footballer who plays as a midfielder for UTC, on loan from César Vallejo.

Career statistics

Club

Notes

References

2001 births
Living people
People from Pisco, Peru
Peruvian footballers
Association football midfielders
Peruvian Primera División players
Club Universitario de Deportes footballers
Serrato Pacasmayo players
Club Deportivo Universidad César Vallejo footballers
Universidad Técnica de Cajamarca footballers